The 2011–12 season will be the 29th season in Getafe CF's history and their eighth consecutive season in La Liga, the top division of Spanish football. It covers a period from 1 July 2011 to 30 June 2012.

Getafe will compete for their first La Liga title after a 16th-place finish in the 2010–11 La Liga. They will also enter the Copa del Rey in the Round of 32.

Players

Squad information

Transfers

In

Total expenditure:  €3 million

Out

 
Total income:  €18.7 million

Club

Coaching staff

Pre-season

Friendly matches

La Liga

League table

Results summary

Results by round

Matches

Copa del Rey

Last 32

See also
2011–12 Copa del Rey
2011–12 La Liga

Notes and references

External links
 

Getafe
Getafe CF seasons